This article contains the results of the Tipperary county hurling team in the Championship during the 1980s.

Tipperary played 26 Championship games during the decade, winning 13, losing 9 and drawing 4. They won 3 Munster titles in 1987, 1988, and 1989, and won 1 All Ireland title in 1989.

1980

1981

1982

1983

1984

1985

1986

1987

1988

1989

References

External links
Tipperary GAA Fan site
Tipperary on Hoganstand.com
Tipperary GAA site
Premierview
Tipperary GAA Archives

1980 in hurling
1981 in hurling
1982 in hurling
1983 in hurling
1984 in hurling
1985 in hurling
1986 in hurling
1987 in hurling
1988 in hurling
1989 in hurling
8